Juan de Almoguera, O.SS.T. (February 18, 1605 – March 2, 1676) was a Roman Catholic prelate who served as Archbishop of Lima (1673–1676) and Bishop of Arequipa (1659–1673).

Biography
Juan de Almoguera was born in Córdoba, Spain and ordained a priest in the Trinitarian Order. On February 17, 1659, Pope Alexander VII, appointed him Bishop of Arequipa. On March 24, 1661, he was consecrated bishop by Agustín Muñoz Sandoval, Bishop of Cuzco. On November 27, 1673, Pope Urban VIII, appointed him Archbishop of Lima where he served until his death on March 2, 1676.

See also
Catholic Church in Peru

References

External links and additional sources
 (for Chronology of Bishops) 
 (for Chronology of Bishops) 
 (for Chronology of Bishops) 
 (for Chronology of Bishops) 

1605 births
1676 deaths
Bishops appointed by Pope Alexander VII
Trinitarian bishops
17th-century Roman Catholic bishops in Peru
Roman Catholic bishops of Arequipa
Roman Catholic archbishops of Lima